Silbo Gomero ('Gomeran whistle'), also known as el silbo ('the whistle'), is a whistled register of Spanish used by inhabitants of La Gomera in the Canary Islands, historically used to communicate across the deep ravines and narrow valleys that radiate through the island. It enabled messages to be exchanged over a distance of up to 5 kilometres. Due to its loud nature, Silbo Gomero was generally used in circumstances of public communication. Messages conveyed ranged from event invitations to public information advisories.
A speaker of Silbo Gomero is sometimes referred to in Spanish as a silbador ('whistler'). Silbo Gomero is a transposition of Spanish from speech to whistling. This oral phoneme-whistled phoneme substitution emulates Spanish phonology through a reduced set of whistled phonemes. It was declared as a Masterpiece of the Oral and Intangible Heritage of Humanity by UNESCO in 2009.

History

Little is known of the original Guanche language or the languages of the Canaries, but it is assumed that their phonological system must have been simple enough to allow an efficient whistled language. Used by the island's original inhabitants, the Guanches, the whistled language existed before the arrival of Spanish settlers and was also spoken on el Hierro, Tenerife, and Gran Canaria. Silbo was adapted to Spanish during the Spanish settlement in the 16th century and was widely spoken throughout the period into the following 17th century. In 1976 Silbo barely remained on el Hierro, where it had flourished at the end of the 19th century.

Use of the language declined in the 1950s, one factor being the economic decline, which forced many speakers to move away to seek better jobs to cope financially. Technological developments such as the telephone played a part in reducing the practicality and utility of the language. The language's earlier survival had been due to its role in overcoming distance and terrain, in addition to the ease with which it is learned by native speakers. Most significantly, in the period from the 1960s to 1980s, many people had turned away from agriculture and so many middle class families did not want their children to speak the language as it was negatively associated with the rural peasants.

In the late 1990s, language revitalization efforts began and initiatives from within the community started. By 1999, the revitalization of Silbo Gomero was furthered by education policies and other legislative measures. It now has official protection as an example of intangible cultural heritage.

Speakers
Many people in La Gomera speak Silbo Gomero, but their expression of the language deviates in minor ways which show the different origins of the speaker. As reported in a 2009 UNESCO report, all of La Gomera's inhabitants understand the language, but only those born before 1950 and the younger generations who attended school since 1999 can “speak” it. Those born before 1950 were taught the language by their elders in their homes, and those who attended or are attending school since 1999 were taught it formally in school. Those born between 1950 and 1980 understand the language but are unable to speak it, as the language was hardly used and negatively viewed during their time of language acquisition.

Revitalization
When this medium of communication was endangered in the late 20th century, revitalization efforts were generated at both community level and governmental level. A combination of initiatives from the La Gomeran community and policies implemented by the authorities saw Silbo Gomero being revitalized and maintained as a cultural asset. These revitalization efforts were well-documented by UNESCO as part of the proceedings for the selection of the 2009 Representative List of the Intangible Cultural Heritage of Humanity.

Community initiatives
In a bid to preserve Silbo Gomero for the island's youth, expert whistlers sought to obtain authorization, which enabled them to teach the language on a free and voluntary basis at a dedicated centre. This initiative by the senior islanders garnered encouraging responses, with parent-teacher associations extending it to all schools. The first of many revitalization measures was thus adopted at the grassroots level, not by public or private entities, which reflected the language attitude of locals towards Silbo Gomero. Education policies which were implemented later were inspired as such – revitalization began at the grassroots and escalated to the highest government bodies.

Government policies
On 26 June 1997, the Parliament of the Canary Islands approved a motion calling on the government to include Silbo Gomero as part of the school curriculum. Silbo Gomero then became a mandatory subject in primary and secondary education, as of July 1999. The provincial government was supportive in its implementation of education policy and also the establishment of a formalized Silbo Gomero curriculum through the publication of El Silbo Gomero, Materiales didácticos (Educational Materials on the Silbo Gomero).

In addition to the compulsory learning of Silbo Gomero at the primary and secondary level, an Island School of Silbo Gomero was established for post-secondary students who wish to continue to train in Silbo Gomero until they become accredited professional instructors. Students of the Island School work to become capable of teaching Silbo Gomero not only to their fellow citizens, but also to tourists who visit La Gomera. This facilitates the sustainability of the revitalization and also works towards language maintenance.

Thereafter, the Ministry of Education, Universities, Culture and Sport of the Canary Islands developed a staff training plan in order to ensure that the elderly expert whistlers can be replaced in the near future by qualified professional teachers with relevant diplomas. This comprised the provision of training courses on proficiency in, and teaching of, Silbo Gomero. The training plan was launched in 2007, with the participation of 18 teachers.

Besides the implementation of education policies, the authorities also sought to strengthen the corpus of Silbo Gomero by developing a project to digitize all recorded audio material. Local, national and worldwide distribution of documentaries on Silbo Gomero were also made. The government also raised the status of Silbo Gomero by selecting the whistled language of La Gomera via the National Historical Heritage Council to represent Spain in the nominations for inclusion on the 2009 Representative List of the Intangible Cultural Heritage of Humanity.

Cultural heritage
Members of the Gomeran community treasure Silbo Gomero as part of the island's identity, and use the whistled language in traditional rituals and festivities on the island. These include "bajadas", which are processions dedicated to the Virgin or the patron saints of the community.

On 15 March 1999, Silbo Gomero was declared as part of the historical ethnographic heritage of the Canary Islands. The annual celebration of “School Encounters with Silbo Gomero” was also inaugurated in La Gomera. In 2005, the monument to Silbo Gomero was inducted in Garajonay National Park.

Tourism
 Silbo Gomero is not only used between Gomerans; visitors to the island have the opportunity to be exposed to it too, in restaurants that provide demonstrations for tourists. Minister of Tourism of La Gomera, Fernando Mendez, has said that whistling is essential to La Gomera's tourism industry.

Features

According to different studies, Silbo Gomero has between 2 and 4 vowels and between 4 and 10 consonants. It is a whistled form of a dialect of Canarian Spanish. Silbo replaces each vowel or consonant with a whistling sound. Whistles are distinguished according to pitch and continuity. As with other whistled forms of non-tonal languages, Silbo works by retaining approximately the articulation of ordinary speech, so "the timbre variations of speech appear in the guise of pitch variations" (Busnel and Classe: v).

Silbo Gomero is a complex language to learn, with its whistling techniques requiring physical precision, and a strength of the body parts used in mechanism of the language, that can only be acquired with practice. Silbo Gomero uses the tongue, lips and hands, differing greatly from conventional language, which uses the mouth cavity to blend and contrast several acoustic frequencies. The whistling mechanism, in contrast, is limited to a single basic pitch between 1,000 and 3,000 hertz. The physical precision comes in the whistler's ability to vary the frequencies at different speeds and start and stop the production of the sound waves. This technique is handed down within La Gomera's community, with unchanged teaching methods that date to the late 19th century. The same pitch can represent many sounds, so Silbo has many fewer phonemes than Spanish. This means that communication can be ambiguous at times. Context and word choice are important for effective communication.

Vowels
The vowels of Silbo Gomero are described roughly as sustained lines of high and low frequency that are distinct from each other. 

The high frequency  vowel represents the  vowels of the spoken language being whistled, while the low frequency whistle of the dark  vowel represents the vowels . It is said that it is not possible to produce any vowels with intermediary frequencies as the whistling mechanism does not have the same functions that the vocal mechanism possess. 
The theory that Silbo Gomero has only two vowels was theorised by Ramón Trujillo of the University of La Laguna in his published book "EL SILBO GOMERO análisis lingüístico" in 1978. His work, containing almost a hundred spectrograms, concludes in a theory that there are only two vowels and four consonants in the Silbo Gomero language. In Trujillo's work Silbo's vowels are given one quality, that of pitch, being either high or low. 
However, in a more recent study, the work of Julien Meyer (2005 – in French only (pg 100), 2008) gives a statistical analysis of the vowels of Silbo showing that there are 4 vowels statistically distinguished in production and that they are also perceived so. 
Also in 2005, Annie Rialland of the University of Paris III: Sorbonne Nouvelle published an acoustic and phonological analysis of Silbo based on new materials, showing that, not only gliding tones, but also intensity modulation plays a role in distinguishing different whistled sounds.

Trujillo's 2005 collaboration with Gomeran whistler Isidro Ortiz and others ("EL SILBO GOMERO Materiales didácticos" - q.v. pdf link below) revises his earlier assertions to state that 4 vowels are indeed perceived (q.v. pg 63 ref. cit.), and describes in detail the areas of divergence between his empirical data and Classe's phonetic hypotheses. Despite Trujillo's 2005 work acknowledging the existence of 4 vowels, his 2006 bilingual work ("El Silbo Gomero. Nuevo estudio fonológico") inexplicably reiterates his 1978 two-vowel theory. Trujillo's 2006 work directly addresses many of Rialland's conclusions, but it seems that at the time of that writing he was unaware of Meyer's work.

However Meyer goes on to say that there are 5 perceived vowels with significant overlap. Rialland (2005) and Trujillo (1978) both agree that the harmonic of the whistle matches the second formant of the spoken vowels. Spoken 's F2 and whistled 's H1 match in their frequency (1480 Hz). However, there is a disconnect in harmonics and formants near the frequency basement. Spoken speech has a wide range of F2 frequencies (790 Hz to 2300 Hz), whistles are limited to between 1200 Hz and 2400 Hz. In whistling the frequency basement must be raised to the minimum whistle harmonic of 1000 Hz reducing frequency spacing in the vowels, which increases misidentification in the lower vowels.

Consonants
Consonants in Silbo Gomero are modifications of the vowel-based “melody line” or “vocal line”. They may be rising or falling or can also be modified by being broken, continuous or occlusive. The four main consonants in the now largely debunked and disproven 1978 analysis were wrongly listed as follows:

The documentation on the official Silbo Gomero page on the UNESCO website is in line with Trujillo's 1978 study. Trujillo (1978) suggested that the consonants are either rises or dips in the "melody line" which can be broken or continuous. Further investigation by Meyer and by Rialland suggests that vowels are stripped to their inherent class of sound which is communicated in the whistle in these ways: voice ( vs ) is transmitted by the whistled feature [-continuity]. A silent pause in the whistle communicates [+voice], while a [+continuous] consonant gives the quality [-voice]. Placement of the consonant (dental, palatal, fricative) is transmitted in whistle by the loci, the sharpness or speed, of the formant transitions between vowels. Consonant classes are simplified into four classes. Extra high loci (near vertical formant loci) denotes affricates and stridents, rising loci denotes alveolar, medial (loci just above the vowel formant) denotes palatal, and falling (low loci) denotes pharyngeal, labial, and fricative. This gives 8 whistled consonants, but including tone gradual decay (with intensity falling off) as a feature on continuous and interrupted sounds gives 10 consonants. In these situations gradual decay is given [+voice], and continuous is given [+liquid].chart requested?

There are two reasons for this anomaly. First, in functional terms,  is high in frequency, and thus extremely useful. Second, as the continuous high-pitched consonant of Silbo already represents many other consonants of the spoken language (and ), it would be very confusing to add on to that list.

Cognitive features
Studies have shown that Silbo Gomero speakers process the whistled register in the same way as the standard spoken language. Studies by Manuel Carreiras of the University of La Laguna and David Corina of the University of Washington published research on Silbo in 2004 and 2005. Their study involved two participant groups of Spanish speakers. One group of Spanish speakers "spoke" Silbo, while the other group did not. Results obtained from monitoring the participants' brain activity by functional magnetic resonance imaging have shown that while non-speakers of Silbo merely processed Silbo as whistling, speakers of Silbo processed the sounds in the same linguistic centers of the brain that processed Spanish sentences.

Others
Filmmaker and photographer Francesca Phillips wrote and directed a 26-minute documentary on the usage of Silbo Gomero in La Gomera, Written in the Wind (2009). The film won Best Short Documentary in Anthropology at The World Mountain Documentary Festival held in Qinghai, China in 2010.

Romanian filmmaker Corneliu Porumboiu directed the 2019 film The Whistlers, in which Silbo features prominently.

French singer Féloche dedicated a song to Silbo.

There are other examples of transposition of an oral natural language into a pitch string. When quickly spoken, Yoruba vowels are assimilated and consonants elided, so the linguistic information is carried by the tone system, which can therefore be transposed into talking drums.

References

External links
 
 
  English translation of Trujillo's 1978 "El Silbo Gomero: análisis lingüístico" (indexed)
 
 

Languages of Spain
Spanish language
Whistled languages
Canarian society
Canarian culture
Guanche
La Gomera
Masterpieces of the Oral and Intangible Heritage of Humanity